Lynn Township is one of twenty-one townships in Knox County, Illinois, USA. As of the 2010 census, its population was 309 and it contained 171 housing units.

Geography

Unincorporated towns
 Centerville at

Cemeteries
The township contains these two cemeteries: Fraker and Galva.

Demographics

School districts
 Galva Community Unit School District 224
 Rowva Community Unit School District 208
 Stark County Community Unit School District 100

Political districts
 Illinois's 18th congressional district
 State House District 74
 State Senate District 37

References
 
 United States Census Bureau 2009 TIGER/Line Shapefiles
 United States National Atlas

External links
 City-Data.com
 Illinois State Archives
 Township Officials of Illinois

Townships in Knox County, Illinois
Galesburg, Illinois micropolitan area
Townships in Illinois